Rashmi (also Rashami, Rashmika) (Sanskrit: रश्मि) is a Hindu, Sanskrit unisexual name in India. Rashmi means a single 'ray of light', a very popular name in Hindu. More common in females as compared to males.

Notable people named Rashmi 
 Rashami Desai (born August 4, 1986), Indian actress, model and dancer
 Rashmi, Indian Actress
 Rashmi Bansal,  Indian writer, entrepreneur, and a youth expert
 Rashmi C. Desai, Indian-American physicist
 Rashmi Doraiswamy, Indian film critic
 Rashmi Gautam, Indian television presenter and film actress
 Rashmi Kumari, Indian carrom champion
 Rashmi Nigam, Indian model and actress
 Rashmi Parida (born July 7, 1977), Indian cricketer
 Rashmi R. Rao, Indian radio personality and actor
 Rashmi Shetty, Indian celebrity dermatologist
 Rashmi Singh, an Indian lyricist
 Rashmi Sinha, Indian businesswoman
 Rashmi Sinha,  nutritional and cancer epidemiologist
 Rashmi Tiwari, Indian human-rights activist
 Rashmi Uday Singh (29 January 1955), Indian food expert
 Rashmi Verma, Indian politician
 Rashmika Mandanna, Indian film actress and model

Others
 Rashmirathi, Ramdhari Singh's 1952 Hindi epic book
 Cyclone Rashmi, seventh tropical cyclone of the 2008 North Indian Ocean cyclone season

Hindu given names
Indian feminine given names